John Burt may refer to:

 John Burt (footballer), English footballer
 John Burt (rugby union) (1874–1933), New Zealand rugby union player, cricketer and businessman
 John Burt (field hockey) (1877–1935), Scottish field hockey player
 John Burt (anti-abortion activist) (1938–2013), American anti-abortion activist and child-molester
 John Graham MacDonald Burt (1809–1868), Scottish physician and author
 John H. Burt (1918–2009), bishop of the Episcopal Diocese of Ohio
 John Mowlem Burt (1845–1918), British businessman in the construction industry

See also 
 John Birt, Baron Birt, former director-general of the BBC